Agnes (and its variant Agnès) is a surname. Notable people with the surname are as follows:

Akite Agnes (born 1983), Ugandan stand-up comedienne and actress
Flavia Agnes (born 1947), Indian lawyer
Lore Agnes (1876–1953), German politician
Mario Agnes (1931–2018), Italian journalist

Surnames from given names